Nabil Saâdou (born 21 July 1997) is an Algerian footballer who plays for USM Khenchela.

On 19 January 2022, Saâdou joined Saudi Arabian club Al-Jabalain.

References

External links

Living people
1997 births
Algerian footballers
Association football defenders
Olympique de Médéa players
JS Kabylie players
Al-Jabalain FC players
Saudi First Division League players
Expatriate footballers in Saudi Arabia
Algerian expatriate sportspeople in Saudi Arabia
21st-century Algerian people
USM Khenchela players